Sardarabad (Armenian: Սարտարապատ) is an Armenian-Argentine bilingual newspaper established in Buenos Aires, Argentina in 1975. It is the official organ of the Armenian Democratic Liberal Party (Ramgavar party) in Argentina. The name title refers to the Battle of Sardarabad of May 1918. Sardarabad is published weekly in Spanish, with a few additional pages in Armenian.

External links
Official website

Armenian Argentine
Armenian-language newspapers
Bilingual newspapers
European-Argentine culture in Buenos Aires
Weekly newspapers published in Argentina
Mass media in Buenos Aires
Armenian Democratic Liberal Party